Mohammad Reza Mahdavi (born 17 December 1972) is an Iranian retired football defender in the Iran Pro League. He has also previously played for the Iran national football team and was in the squad for the 2000 AFC Asian Cup.

Mahdavi played for three seasons with R. Charleroi S.C. in the Belgian First Division.

References

External links
 

1972 births
Living people
People from Tehran
Iranian footballers
Bahman players
Esteghlal F.C. players
R. Charleroi S.C. players
Persepolis F.C. players
Sepahan S.C. footballers
Shahrdari Bandar Abbas players
Esteghlal Ahvaz players
2000 AFC Asian Cup players
Persian Gulf Pro League players
Belgian Pro League players
Association football central defenders
Iranian expatriate sportspeople in Belgium
Iran international footballers